Exotic Birds and Fruit is the seventh full-length studio album by British progressive rock band Procol Harum.  It was released in 1974. The cover artwork for the album is by Jakob Bogdani, a noted Hungarian artist whose paintings centred on exotic birds and fruit.

In Argentina, the album was titled Pájaros Y Frutas Exóticas (literally translated as "Birds and Exotic Fruit").

Recording

Collaborating again with producer Chris Thomas, Procol Harum recorded the album at George Martin's Air London Studios in London. According to singer/songwriter/piano player and bandleader Gary Brooker, the album was recorded in reaction to the two preceding albums which used extensive orchestration. Brooker stated, "We made the live album with an orchestra. We'd then taken the orchestra into the studio for 'Grand Hotel'...we'd had enough of orchestras".

The album features the song "Butterfly Boys", written about the founders of the band's record label at the time, Chrysalis. The band were unhappy with the terms of their contract and expressed that frustration in song.

Reception
Exotic Birds and Fruit met with a good critical reception but only rose to No. 86 on the Billboard album charts. In Denmark, it peaked at #9 upon release, and in early 1975 it re-entered the Top 20 peaking at #19. The album was preceded by the single release of the opening track, "Nothing but the Truth", backed with the single-only B-side track "Drunk Again".

2009 Salvo reissue
In 2009 Salvo reissued Procol Harum's entire discography on CD remastered by Nick Robbins. The reissue for Exotic Birds and Fruit included two bonus tracks selected by Brooker and Keith Reid. "Drunk Again", the B-side to the single "Nothing but the Truth", appeared on CD along with an alternate mix of "As Strong as Samson".

Track listing
All music by Gary Brooker, all lyrics by Keith Reid.

Charts

Personnel
Procol Harum
 Gary Brooker – vocals, piano
 Mick Grabham – guitar
 BJ Cole – pedal steel guitar track 3
 Chris Copping – organ
 Alan Cartwright – bass guitar
 B. J. Wilson – drums

Production
Produced By Chris Thomas
Engineer: John Punter

Release history

References

External links
 ProcolHarum.com – ProcolHarum.com's page on this album

Procol Harum albums
1974 albums
Albums produced by Chris Thomas (record producer)
Chrysalis Records albums
Festival Records albums
Repertoire Records albums